Henry Lion (August 11, 1900 – October 25, 1966) was an American sculptor. His work was part of the sculpture event in the art competition at the 1932 Summer Olympics.

References

1900 births
1966 deaths
20th-century American sculptors
20th-century American male artists
American male sculptors
Olympic competitors in art competitions
People from Fresno, California